Peptidyl-prolyl cis-trans isomerase, mitochondrial (PPIF) is an enzyme that in humans is encoded by the PPIF gene. It has also been referred to as, but should not be confused with, cyclophilin D (CypD), which is encoded by the PPID gene. As a member of the peptidyl-prolyl cis-trans isomerase (PPIase) family, this protein catalyzes the cis-trans isomerization of proline imidic peptide bonds, which allows it to facilitate folding or repair of proteins. PPIF is a major component of the mitochondrial permeability transition pore (MPTP) and, thus, highly involved in mitochondrial metabolism and apoptosis, as well as in mitochondrial diseases and related conditions, including cardiac diseases, neurodegenerative diseases, and muscular dystrophy. In addition, PPIF participates in inflammation, as well as in ischemic reperfusion injury, AIDS, and cancer.

Structure 
Like other cyclophilins, PPIF forms a β-barrel structure with a hydrophobic core. This β-barrel is composed of eight anti-parallel β-strands and capped by two α-helices at the top and bottom. In addition, the β-turns and loops in the strands contribute to the flexibility of the barrel. PPIF weighs 17.5 kDa and forms part of the MPTP in the inner mitochondrial membrane (IMM).

Function 
The protein encoded by this gene is a member of the peptidyl-prolyl cis-trans isomerase (PPIase) family. PPIases catalyze the cis-trans isomerization of proline imidic peptide bonds in oligopeptides and accelerate the folding of proteins.  Generally, PPIases are found in all eubacteria and eukaryotes, as well as in a few archaebacteria, and thus are highly conserved. The PPIase family is further divided into three structurally distinct subfamilies: cyclophilin (CyP), FK506-binding protein (FKBP), and parvulin (Pvn). As a cyclophilin, PPI binds cyclosporin A (CsA) and can be found within in the cell or secreted by the cell. In eukaryotes, cyclophilins localize ubiquitously to many cell and tissue types, though studies on PPIF focus primarily on heart, liver, and brain tissue. In addition to PPIase and protein chaperone activities, cyclophilins also function in mitochondrial metabolism, apoptosis, immunological response, inflammation, and cell growth and proliferation. PPIF is especially involved in mitochondrial apoptosis as a major component of the MPTP. Through its PPIase ability, the protein interacts with and induces a conformational change in adenine nucleotide translocase (ANT), the other MPTP component. This activation, along with high calcium ion levels, induces the opening the MPTP, resulting in mitochondrial swelling, increasing reactive oxygen species (ROS) levels, membrane depolarization, failing ATP production, caspase cascade activation, and ultimately, apoptosis.

Clinical significance 

As a cyclophilin, PPIF binds the immunosuppressive drug CsA to form a CsA-cyclophilin complex, which then targets calcineurin to inhibit the signaling pathway for T-cell activation.

Due to its association with the MPTP, PPIF is also involved in neurodegenerative diseases, including glaucoma, diabetic retinopathy, Parkinson’s disease, and Alzheimer’s disease. For neurodegenerative diseases, treatment of reperfusion events with CsA, a PPID inhibitor, prevents cytochrome C release and significantly reduces cell death in neurons. As such, PPID proves to be an effective therapeutic target for patients suffering neurodegenerative diseases.

In addition, PPIF, as part of the MPTP, is involved in ischemia/reperfusion injury, traumatic brain injury (TBI), muscular dystrophy, and drug toxicity. Though PPIF was identified as a candidate for dilated cardiomyopathy (DCM) for one afflicted family, further study revealed no mutations in the gene to implicate it in the disease. Nonetheless, in cardiac myogenic cells, cyclophilins have been observed to be activated by heat shock and hypoxia-reoxygenation as well as complex with heat shock proteins. Thus, cyclophilins may function in cardioprotection during ischemia-reperfusion injury.

Currently, cyclophilin expression is highly correlated with cancer pathogenesis, but the specific mechanisms remain to be elucidated.

Interactions 

PPIF has been shown to interact with:
 CsA
 ANT

References

Further reading

External links